Goodenia wilunensis is a species of flowering plant in the family Goodeniaceae and is endemic to central regions of Western Australia. It is an ascending to prostrate annual herb covered with silky hairs and has elliptic to egg-shaped leaves with the narrower end towards the base, and racemes of yellow flowers with purplish markings.

Description
Leaves on the stems are smaller. Flowering occurs from July to October.

Taxonomy and naming
Goodenia wilunensis was first formally described in 1980 by Roger Charles Carolin in the journal Telopea from a specimen collected by Charles Gardner near Wiluna in 1931. The specific epithet (wilunensis) refers to the town near where the type specimen was collected.

Distribution
This goodenia grows in sandy soil, often in creek beds in the Gascoyne, Little Sandy Desert, Murchison and Pilbara biogeographic regions of central Western Australia.

Conservation status
Goodenia wilunensis is classified as "not threatened" by the Government of Western Australia Department of Parks and Wildlife.

References

wilunensis
Eudicots of Western Australia
Plants described in 1980
Taxa named by Roger Charles Carolin